KBSV (channel 23) is a non-commercial independent television station licensed to Ceres, California, United States, broadcasting Assyrian programming to the southern portion of the Sacramento–Stockton–Modesto market. Owned by Bet-Nahrain, Inc. it is a sister station to KBES radio (89.5 FM). The two stations share studios at the Bet-Nahrain Assyrian Cultural Center on South Central Avenue in Ceres; KBSV's transmitter is located atop Mount Oso in western Stanislaus County.

It is only carried on cable in the Stockton, Modesto, Sonora and Turlock areas (primarily on channel 15), and is not available on DirecTV or Dish Network.

KBSV was the first Assyrian television station in the world, and began broadcasting on April 14, 1996. It began webcasting 24 hours a day in 1997.

Subchannel

See also
ANB SAT
Suroyo TV
Suryoyo Sat
Ishtar TV

References

External links

BSV
Aramaic-language television channels
Assyrian-American culture in California
Ceres, California
Television channels and stations established in 1996
1996 establishments in California